Knjaževac Airport (in use 1989–1996) was situated north of Knjaževac, 500 m north of the village of Minićevo, on the right side of the Knjaževac-Zaječar road and railway. The airport was opened on 19 September 1989 and it was designed for sport flights airplanes, gliders and parachuting jumps, and especially for ultra light aircraft. The surrounding area is very attractive because of the clean nature, it had a large potential for aero tourism in the Knjaževac municipality. The two pilot zones "Mali izvor" and "Debelica" were near the airport.
Flights were controlled from Niš Constantine the Great International Airport. The airport was closed in 1996, when the local government returned the land to previous owners in an attempt to stop the growing displeasure about the situation in the country. What remains of the airport is an old hangar which is not in use anymore and the aircraft that was used at the airport, PZL-104 Wilga 35A, which stands like a monument to a forgotten era of Yugoslavian aviation. The aircraft has not been flown since 1996, and since the airfield was destroyed in a matter of hours, it was unable to fly to the nearest working airport. During the years it was torn apart by thieves and all that remains now is a shell of a dead plane. The main pilot in charge of the airfield and the Knjaževac Aero Club was Velibor Antonić. The last flight in his career was in the very same Wilga 35A.

Food and accommodation were available in motels at the airport, in Suvodolski monastery (5 kilometres from the airport), there are also tourist attractions in the vicinity and Hotels in Knjaževac and Zaječar.
connections to the city by train and bus.

The closed airport is close to the new ski centre with new ski lifts on Stara Planina.

External links 
 Knjaževac Airport information (PDF)

Defunct airports
Airports in Serbia